The mythological Greek deity Hades often appears in popular culture. In spite of his present neutrality and lack of bad deeds, he is often portrayed as a villain due to his association with death and the underworld.

Film and Television 
Hades (under his Roman name Pluto) appears in Pasolini's film The Canterbury Tales. He is portrayed by Italian actor Giuseppe Arrigio. In the film, he chances upon the blind cuckold Sir January while strolling through January's secret garden. He feels pity for January so he uses his powers to give him back his eyesight so that he may see his wife cheating on him. See also The Merchant's Tale.

Hades appears in the movies Percy Jackson & the Olympians: The Lightning Thief played by Steve Coogan, and the remake of Clash of the Titans and its sequel Wrath of the Titans, where he is played by Ralph Fiennes.

In the three television series Hercules: The Legendary Journeys, Xena: Warrior Princess and Young Hercules Hades was a recurring character, most frequently played by Erik Thomson, although Mark Ferguson and Stephen Lovatt have also played the part. He was depicted as being overworked and understaffed.

In the DC comics TV series Smallville, the powerful and demonic deity Darkseid was in Earth's history by many names such as Hades and Lucifer and was also connected to the Hindu goddess Kali.

An anime television series adaption of the PSP game Kamigami no Asobi was aired from April 2014 until July 2014, where Hades is one of the few gods sent by Zeus to an academy located in a separate realm which resembles a human high school to learn about the meaning of love and humanity, in an attempt to reverse the weakening bond between humans and the gods.

In the Disney 1997 film Hercules, Hades appears as the main antagonist. Unlike the mythological Hades, this version is a fast-talking, hot-tempered, evil deity; a combination of Satan and a dodgy Hollywood agent. He plans to overthrow Zeus and rule the Universe but kill Hercules before that so the hero doesn't foil his plot. However, he failed, and was trapped in the River of Death for all eternity. The character was voiced by James Woods.

In 2016, Hades was portrayed by Greg Germann in Once Upon a Time. This version is based on the Disney version from Hercules and is depicted as being in love with Zelena, the Wicked Witch of the West. 

In the last movie of the Disney trilogy Descendants, it is revealed that Hades, is the father of the protagonist Mal, that he had from his former marriage with Maleficent, the villain from the Disney film Sleeping Beauty.

Music
 Anaïs Mitchell's folk opera Hadestown presents Hades as the boss of a post-apocalyptic Depression-era company town. The 2010 recording features Greg Brown performing the deep-voiced part of Hades. In the Broadway debut of the show, the role of Hades was played by Patrick Page.
 South Korean boy band VIXX's 2016 album Hades presents Hades as the character theme of their album and the title song "Fantasy". It is the second album in a series about Greek Gods.
 The name of musician, Aidoneus, is a reference to the origin of Hades' name, the earliest attested form being Aḯdēs (Ἀΐδης), which later branched into popular poetic variations, such as Aïdōneús (Ἀϊδωνεύς). His song, Persephone in the Garden, is sung from the perspective of Hades.

Gaming
 Hades appears in several installments of the God of War video game series. He was voiced by Nolan North in the first game and by Clancy Brown in God of War III and Ascension.
 Hades is one of the main characters of the PSP game Kamigami no Asobi: Ludere Deorum (translated as Mischief of the Gods), where he is a potential love interest for the protagonist.
 Hades can be worshipped in Zeus: Master of Olympus, providing benefits to the player's city.
 Hades appears in the Kingdom Hearts series with a personality based on his appearance in the Disney movie Hercules. James Woods reprises his voice as Hades.
 Hades appears in Age of Mythology and Age of Empires: Mythologies.
 Hades plays a major role in Herc's Adventures.
 Hades is the main antagonist in Kid Icarus: Uprising, voiced by S. Scott Bullock. In terms of personality, he is very similar to James Woods' role for Disney. He first appears at the end of Chapter 9 when Pit and Palutena believe the war against the Underworld Army is over. However, Hades reveals himself to be the true enemy controlling the Underworld. By the end of the game, he is defeated. 
 In Persona 2: Innocent Sin, Hades is Eikichi Mishina's ultimate Persona.
 Hades appears in Smite, a multiplayer online battle arena, as a playable god. 
 An AI named "HADES" is the main antagonist of Horizon: Zero Dawn. Created as a subordinate function of the terraforming system GAIA, HADES was designed to take control and reverse the terraforming process in the event that the process had failed, allowing the system to start with a clean slate.
 He appears in the second installment of the 'Fate of Atlantis' downloadable content pack for Assassin's Creed Odyssey.
Hades, also known as Solus zos Galvus and Emet-Selch, is the main antagonist of Final Fantasy XIV: Shadowbringers. He is voiced by René Zagger in English and Hiroki Takahashi in Japanese.
 Hades appears as a pivotal character in the roguelike action role-playing video game Hades by Supergiant Games, as the father to the main character Zagreus.
 Hades appears as the final boss of Rayman Legends known as Hades' Hand, created by a form of dark energy that gives him the ability to shapeshift at will.

Literature
 He appears in several installments of the series Percy Jackson and the Olympians. 
 He also has three revealed demigod children in the series, Bianca and Nico di Angelo, and Hazel Levesque. Nico and Hazel are the only ones alive, Hazel being resurrected by Nico.
 In John C. Wright's Titans of Chaos, he, off-stage, is one of the factions who must be appeased about how the children are kept. Furthermore, he puts forward his wife's claim to the throne of Olympus after Zeus's death.  He is referred to as "Unseen One" and "Lord Dis".
 In Poul Anderson's retelling of Orpheus, "Goat Song", the computer SUM preserves all dead humans for a foretold resurrection and is the Hades figure that he must persuade to bring his dead love back to life.
 He appears in the God of War comic series (2010–11) by DC Comics, which spans from the video game franchise. In it, he enters into a wager with five other Olympian gods who each choose a champion to search for the Ambrosia of Asclepius, an elixir with magical healing properties.
 Hades is an alias in Hiro Mashima's Manga/Anime series Fairy Tail for the character Master Purehito of the guild Grimore Heart, whose objective in the story is to find the black wizard Zeref, in order to create "The Grand Magic World".
 Hades makes a brief appearance in the book "Skin Game", a part of The Dresden Files series by Jim Butcher. Harry Dresden is pressed into helping break into Hades' vault in search of a holy relic and later meets the Greek God.
 Hades made his debut in Ichiei Ishibumi's light novel series High School DxD, and services as the main antagonist throughout Volume 11 and Volume 12, aiding Khaos Brigade's Old Satan Faction and Hero Faction behind the scenes in a scheme to destroy the Devils and Fallen Angels. He commands a legion of Grim Reapers.
Hades is the main character in the webcomic Lore Olympus.
Hades appears in DC comics' Wonder Woman
Hades appears in the manga Record of Ragnarok, where he fights for the gods in the 7th round of the tournament against humanity's Qin Shi Huang.
 In Matthew Reilly's Jack West Jr series, "Hades" is another name for the King of the Underworld, a title held by mortal men for centuries.  The Underworld is one of the four legendary kingdoms who have ruled the world for millennia from behind the scenes, and the Hades of Greek mythology was not a god, but rather a previous King of the Underworld whose exploits and relationships with historical figures were embellished into legend.  The current Hades, introduced in The Four Legendary Kingdoms, is an ultra-wealthy shipping magnate whose royal duty is to host the Great Games of the Hydra in order to stave off an apocalyptic event and further empower the four kingdoms.  He is depicted as a moral and fair-minded individual who does not enjoy his duties, and he ultimately joins Jack West in his mission to thwart the apocalypse without propping up the kingdoms in the process.

Science
A species of burrowing blind snake, Gerrhopilus hades, is named after the god Hades.

See also

 List of Greek mythological figures

References

Popular culture
Classical mythology in popular culture
Greek underworld in popular culture